José Alves de Cerqueira César (23 May 1835 – 26 July 1911) was a Brazilian politician who served as president (governor) of the State of São Paulo from December 1891 to August 1892.

Cerqueira César was born in Guarulhos. He graduated in 1860 from the Law School of São Paulo and was public defender in the city of Itapetininga. He was secretary and president of the Republican Party of São Paulo and assumed the position of Treasury Inspector for the State of São Paulo in 1889.

He was elected First Vice-President of the State of São Paulo for the mandate 1891–1892. The city of Cerqueira César in the state is named after him.

He died in São Paulo, aged 76.

External links
Message to the Legislative Congress of 1892 (in Portuguese)

1835 births
1911 deaths
People from Guarulhos
Governors of São Paulo (state)
University of São Paulo alumni
Public defenders